Storer Broadcasting, Inc. was an American company which owned several television and radio stations in the Northeastern United States. It was incorporated in Ohio 1927, and was broken up in 1986.

History

1920s–1940s

In 1927, George B. Storer and brother-in-law J. Harold Ryan founded Fort Industry Oil Company to build service stations for Speedene brand gasoline in the Toledo, Ohio area. Speedene sales were booming, thanks to a cost-cutting device implemented by the partners. They bypassed the cost of trucking gasoline to service stations by building the stations beside railroad sidings and sold their product at two or three cents a gallon under the going retail rate by filling their tanks directly from railroad tank cars.

Storer decided to buy some radio spots on Toledo's radio station, WTAL, to advertise his gas stations. The spots were effective, and in 1928 Storer decided to use his wealth to buy a stake in the radio station as well. As part of the deal, WTAL changed its call letters to WSPD, "Speedy AM," symbolic of the gasoline brand.

In 1931, Fort Industry sold its oil interests to concentrate solely on broadcasting. It bought full control of WSPD in 1937, and bought a number of other radio stations.

1950s–1960s
Although the company had success in the Top 40 rock and roll format with WJBK in Detroit and WIBG "Wibbage" in Philadelphia, most of its radio stations, including WJW in Cleveland, WAGA in Atlanta and WSPD, featured more conservative music formats, typically middle-of-the-road (MOR), country music or beautiful music.

In 1948, Fort Industry entered the television market, launching WSPD-TV in Toledo. This was followed by WJBK-TV in Detroit later in 1948, and WAGA-TV in Atlanta in 1949. As television became more popular, Storer bought several television stations in other markets. The company changed its name to Storer Broadcasting later in the 1950s. A notable trademark of Storer stations were their studio facilities being built to resemble Southern antebellum mansions; while in most of Storer's markets (Toledo, Detroit, Boston, etc.) the architecture was somewhat out of place, it fit in perfectly in Atlanta and Birmingham. WJW, notably, did not get a facility in this design when a new studio complex was built for them in the mid-1970s, instead opting for a more modern approach, as did WITI in 1978. Almost all of the stations that had these facilities are still based in them in some fashion to this day.

The company focused primarily on the radio and television businesses through much of its history. However, it did venture into the cable television business in the early 1960s. It also purchased Northeast Airlines in 1965 and held it until 1972, when it was sold to Delta Air Lines.

George Storer was company president until his 1973 retirement, succeeded by his son Peter; George remained company chairman until his death in 1975. Due to his position as a director of CBS, he was able to obtain lucrative CBS network affiliations for Storer-owned television stations, such as WXEL (now WJW-TV) and WJBK-TV, which had been DuMont affiliates. By 1961 Storer was the nation's sixth-largest television broadcaster—exceeded in size only by the three networks (ABC, CBS, and NBC), Metropolitan Broadcasting (later Metromedia) and the Group W division of Westinghouse Electric.

The company purchased its first cable television system in 1963. It also briefly ventured into program syndication as Storer Programs Inc., during which it was the U.S. distributor of the original 1963–65 run of The Littlest Hobo, which was produced in Canada.

1970s–1980s
During the 1970s the company focused on cable television. Storer sold the radio assets and the airline, using the cash thus raised to invest in cable television. Commencing in 1978, it embarked on an aggressive program of acquiring cable franchises. Unlike many cable operators, Storer preferred to acquire franchises and build its cable systems rather than acquire existing cable operations.

The company also ventured into sports. From 1973 to 1975 Storer owned the Boston Bruins and the Boston Garden.

The company's name was changed to Storer Communications, Inc. in 1983. By 1984 it owned and operated seven television stations and held franchises to provide cable television service to over 500 communities in 18 states and had some 4,800 employees. During that time, Storer co-produced nationally syndicated programs under a joint venture with Blair Entertainment, a distribution firm founded in 1975 as the second iteration of Rhodes Productions and was renamed to the moniker it held at the time in 1983 when it was acquired by John Blair and Company. In 1985, Kohlberg Kravis Roberts (KKR) took Storer Communications private in a hostile leveraged buyout after Comcast began showing interest in Storer's cable properties. It sold the television assets in 1987. WTVG (the former WSPD-TV) was sold to a local ownership group, eventually becoming an ABC owned-and-operated (O&O) station in 1995 (it had been an NBC affiliate for all but five years of its history prior to its sale to ABC, with primary CBS affiliation from 1955-58 and primary ABC affiliation from 1958-69). The remaining former Storer television stations were sold to Gillett Communications in 1987 after an aborted 1986 attempt to sell them with Wometco's WTVJ in Miami to Lorimar-Telepictures. (WTVJ eventually became an NBC owned-and-operated station.) SCI Holdings (the holding company for Storer Communications, Inc) had placed up the cable unit, which was Storer Cable up for sale that year. Storer later revoked the no sale decision for the cable business, choosing to keep the Storer Cable division instead.

Gillett's broadcasting division was restructured into SCI Television in 1991, then sold to New World Communications in 1993, after a speculative bid from Scripps-Howard that never came to fruition, due to the number of stations that would have been potentially owned at the same time. Blair was then folded into New World's distribution arm.

Fox Television Stations purchased the stations (except for WSBK and KNSD) in 1997.

Most of the stations switched to Fox affiliation, resulting in CBS scrambling to find affiliates in Atlanta, Cleveland, Detroit and Milwaukee, and eventually landing UHF stations in those cities. WSBK remained independent and was sold to Viacom, and eventually became a UPN affiliate. KNSD, which remained an NBC affiliate, was later sold directly to NBC to become an NBC owned-and-operated station. The cable assets were sold to Comcast Corporation and TCI in 1988. Michael Tallent became President of Storer, succeeding Kenneth Bagwell, upon the consummation of this transaction.

Storer Communications continued to operate as a cable television company until the assets were split between Comcast and TCI in the mid-1990s. Tallent joined Comcast in 1991 and was succeeded by William Whelan, Storer's final president.

Stations formerly owned by Storer

Television stations
Stations are arranged in alphabetical order by state and city of license.

Note: two boldface asterisks appearing following a station's call letters (**) indicate a station that was built and/or signed-on by Storer.

Radio stations

References

Defunct broadcasting companies of the United States
Defunct radio broadcasting companies of the United States
Defunct companies based in Ohio
Boston Bruins owners
Mass media companies established in 1927
Mass media companies disestablished in 1986
Comcast
1927 establishments in Ohio